Pollachi Mappillai is a 2010 Indian Tamil language comedy film directed by R. Lakshmanan. The film features Sathyaraj and Susan in lead roles with Goundamani in a pivotal role. The film, produced by Mangai Harirajan, had musical score by Deva and was released after several delays in 16 July 2010 to positive reviews. But it was a flop at the box office.

Cast
Sathyaraj as Sengaaliyappan
Goundamani
Susan
Manivannan as Manju
Vinu Chakravarthy as Muthu Gounder
T. P. Gajendran
Anu Mohan
Alex
Abhinayashree

Production
Television serial director Mangai Harirajan chose to make a film with Sathyaraj in a venture titled Kootani Aatchi in early 2005. The project meant that Sathyaraj and Harirajan agreed to shelve another film they were making together titled Perumal Samy, a film based on a Kolkata-based hangman with Sibiraj also in the cast. Lakshmanan, an associate to Sundar C, was selected to make his debut as director; while Susan who had appeared in Neranja Manasu (2004) was roped in to play heroine. In April 2005, the team chose to change the film's title to Kovai Express, supposedly inspired by Kamal Haasan's film from the same period, Mumbai Xpress. The title was soon after changed to Pollachi Mappillai.

Production delays of the film, led to slow progress and long breaks between schedules. An item number featuring Gurleen Chopra was added and the team began preparing for a Summer 2008 release, though further financial constraints meant more delays.

Soundtrack 
Soundtrack was composed by Deva. The soundtrack of the film was released in March 2008 at Hotel Green Park in a ceremony which involved several film producers.
"Indha Guindy" - Senthil, Jayalakshmi
"Mappillai Mappillai" - Madurai Panneerselvam
"Mithuraa" - Sofiya
"Vecha Idam" - Mano, Sofiya

Release
The film eventually had a low key release in July 2010, with little spending by the team on publicity. It had an average box office opening, though quickly slipped out of theatres. The New Indian Express labelled the film as "very forgettable".

References

External links
 

2010 films
Indian comedy films
2010s Tamil-language films
Films scored by Deva (composer)
2010 comedy films